Plan 9 from Outer Space is a 1959 American independent science fiction-horror film produced, written, directed, and edited by Ed Wood. The film was shot in black-and-white in November 1956 and had a test screening on March 15, 1957, at the Carlton Theatre in Los Angeles under the title Grave Robbers from Outer Space. Retitled Plan 9 from Outer Space, it went into general release on July 22, 1959, in Texas and several other southern states before being sold to television in 1961.

The film stars Gregory Walcott, Mona McKinnon, Tor Johnson, and "Vampira" (Maila Nurmi) and is narrated by Criswell. It also posthumously bills Bela Lugosi (before Lugosi's death in August 1956, Wood had shot silent footage of Lugosi for another, unfinished film, which was inserted into Plan 9). Other guest stars are Hollywood veterans Lyle Talbot, who said he never refused an acting job, and former cowboy star Tom Keene.

The film's storyline concerns extraterrestrials who seek to stop humanity from creating a doomsday weapon that could destroy the universe. The aliens implement "Plan 9", a scheme to resurrect the Earth's dead. By causing chaos, the aliens hope the crisis will force humanity to listen to them; otherwise, the aliens will destroy mankind with armies of undead.

Plan 9 from Outer Space played on television in relative obscurity from 1961 until 1980, when authors Harry Medved and Michael Medved dubbed it the "worst film ever made" in their book The Golden Turkey Awards. Wood and his film were posthumously given two Golden Turkey Awards for Worst Director Ever and Worst Film Ever. It has since been called "the epitome of so-bad-it's-good cinema" and gained a large cult following.

Plot

Mourners gather around an old man at his wife's grave site as an airliner overhead flies toward Burbank, California. Pilot Jeff Trent and co-pilot Danny are startled by a bright light, accompanied by a loud noise. They look outside and see a flying saucer land at the cemetery, where two gravediggers are killed by a female ghoul.

Lost in grief, the old man is struck and killed by a car near his home. Mourners at his funeral discover the gravediggers' corpses. When Inspector Daniel Clay and his police officers arrive, Clay goes off alone to investigate.

Jeff and his wife, Paula (who live near the cemetery), hear sirens. He tells her about his flying saucer encounter, saying that the Army has sworn him to secrecy. As the saucer lands, a powerful swooshing noise knocks the Trents and the people at the cemetery to the ground. Clay is killed by both the female ghoul and the old man's reanimated corpse. Lieutenant Harper says: "But one thing's sure. Inspector Clay is dead, murdered, and somebody's responsible".

Newspaper headlines report flying saucer sightings over Hollywood Boulevard, and three fly across Los Angeles. In Washington, D.C., the military fires missiles at more saucers. Chief of saucer operations Thomas Edwards says the government has been covering up saucer attacks, and a small town has been annihilated.

The aliens return to their Space Station 7, and Commander Eros tells the alien ruler that he has been unsuccessful in contacting Earth's governments. Eros recommends "Plan 9", the resurrection of recently deceased humans. Concerned about Paula's safety, Jeff urges her to stay with her mother, but she refuses. That night, the undead old man breaks into their house and pursues Paula outside, where the female ghoul and Inspector Clay join him. Paula escapes, finally collapsing after the three ghouls return to Eros in the saucer.

At the Pentagon, General Roberts tells Edwards that aliens have been telling the government that they are trying to prevent humanity from destroying the universe. Roberts sends Edwards to San Fernando, where most of the alien activity has occurred.

Clay attacks Eros, nearly killing him. After examining Clay, the ruler orders the old man destroyed to further frighten humanity. He approves Eros's Plan 9 to raise armies of the dead to march on Earth's capitals.

Edwards and the police interview the Trents, unaware that the flying saucer has returned to the cemetery. Officer Kelton encounters the old man, who chases him to the Trents' house. Eros's ray strikes the old man, reducing him to a skeleton. Edwards, the Trents, and the police drive to the cemetery.

Harper insists on leaving Paula in the car; when she refuses to remain there alone, Kelton stays. Eros and Tanna (his fellow female alien) send Clay to kidnap Paula and lure the other three humans to the saucer. Seeing its glow in the distance, Jeff and the police approach it. Clay knocks Kelton out.

Eros lets Jeff and the police enter the saucer with pistols drawn. He tells them that human weapons development will lead to the discovery of "solaronite", a substance that explodes sunlight particles. Such an explosion would set off an uncontrollable chain reaction, destroying the universe. Eros believes that humans are immature and stupid; he intends to destroy humanity, threatening to kill Paula if Jeff and the police try to stop him. Kelton and Larry arrive and see Clay near the saucer carrying the unconscious Paula. Realizing that their weapons are useless, they sneak up behind Clay and knock him out with a club. Eros says that Clay's controlling ray has been shut off, which released Paula. He and Jeff fight, and the saucer's equipment (damaged in their struggle) catches fire. The humans escape, and Tanna and the unconscious Eros take off. The fire quickly consumes the saucer, which explodes, and the ghouls decompose into skeletons.

Cast

 Gregory Walcott as Jeff Trent
 Mona McKinnon as Paula Trent
 Duke Moore as Lt. John Harper
 Tom Keene as Col. Tom Edwards
 Carl Anthony as Patrolman Larry
 Paul Marco as Patrolman Kelton
 Tor Johnson as Inspector Daniel Clay
 Dudley Manlove as Eros
 Joanna Lee as Tanna
 John Breckinridge as The Ruler
 Lyle Talbot as Gen. Roberts
 David De Mering as Danny
 Norma McCarty as Edie the stewardess
 Bill Ash as Captain
 Lynn Lemon as Minister at Clay's funeral
 Ben Frommer and Gloria Dea as Mourners
 Conrad Brooks as Patrolman Jamie
 Maila Nurmi (Vampira) as Vampire Girl
 Bela Lugosi as the Old Man/Ghoul Man
 Tom Mason as Old Man/Ghoul Man stand-in, Lugosi's fake Shemp (uncredited)
 Criswell as himself/narrator
 Karl Johnson as Farmer Calder (uncredited)
 Ed Wood as man Holding Newspaper (uncredited)
 J. Edward Reynolds as Gravedigger
 Hugh Thomas, Jr. as Gravedigger (also associate producer)

Production

Background and genre

The film combines elements of science fiction, Atompunk, and gothic horror. Science fiction remained popular throughout the 1950s, though the genre had experienced significant changes in the post-war period. The Atomic Age, heralded by the development of nuclear weapons and the atomic bombings of Hiroshima and Nagasaki, had inspired science fiction films to deal with the dangers of unrestricted science, while space flight and the existence of extraterrestrial life and civilizations (more "traditional" elements of the genre), seemed to hold a new fascination for audiences at the beginning of the Space Race. On the other hand, the height of Gothic film's popularity was during the 1930s and 1940s. It was in decline by the 1950s, considered old-fashioned. By 1950s standards, the combination of dated and modern elements gives the film a rather anachronistic quality.

Plan 9s script seems to aim at being an epic film, a genre typically requiring a big budget from a major film studio. That Wood made it with minimal financial resources underscores one of the qualities of his work: his ideas tended to be too expensive to film, yet he tried to film them anyway. As Rob Craig argues, Wood's failed efforts give the film a peculiar charm. Craig finds that Plan 9 has much in common with both epic theatre ("grand melodrama on a minuscule budget") and the Theatre of the Absurd (characters acting as buffoons, nonsense, and verbosity in dialogue, dreamlike and fantasy imagery, hints of allegory, and a narrative structure where continuity is consistently undermined).

The introduction and its origins
The film opens with an introduction by Wood's friend, psychic Criswell: "Greetings, my friends! We are all interested in the future, for that is where you and I are going to spend the rest of our lives!" (This line appears in the narration for General Motors' "Futurama" ride and its accompanying film, To New Horizons, which were part of the 1939 New York World's Fair—years before Criswell's television program.) At the time of filming, Criswell was the star of the KLAC Channel 13 (now KCOP-13) television series Criswell Predicts. The introduction could be an allusion to the opening lines of his show (a Criswell Predicts title card appears at the start of the scene), but since no episodes of the television show are known to survive, a comparison is impossible. Craig suggests that Criswell's public persona was based on the style of a charismatic preacher, perhaps influenced by early televangelists. He addresses the viewers repeatedly as "my friends", as if attempting to establish a bond between the speaker and the audience. The line likely derives from his show, and would not be out of place in a segment where a televangelist addresses his congregation. Another phrase of the introduction, "Future events such as these will affect you in the future", was a signature line for Criswell. He used it repeatedly in his newspaper and magazine columns, and probably his show.

Another line asserts that the audience is interested in "the unknown, the mysterious, the unexplainable", implying that the film's audience will have a fascination with the paranormal. The narrator claims that "we" (the filmmakers) are bringing to light the full story and evidence of fateful events, based on the survivors' "secret testimony". The narration seems to emulate the style of sensational headlines in tabloid newspapers, and promises audiences access to "lurid secrets" as if following the example of True Confessions and similar scandal magazines. The notion that a film or show could be based on true incidents and testimony would be familiar to a 1950s audience, because it was used in contemporary police procedurals such as Dragnet.

Changing the tone, Criswell delivers the sermon-like lines: "Let us punish the guilty! Let us reward the innocent!". The introduction concludes with the question: "Can your heart stand the shocking facts about graverobbers from outer space?" The latter phrase was the original title of the film, but the rest of the line again seems to emulate the sensationalist press.

The film's postscript, also narrated by Criswell and delivered in the same tone as the introduction, provides the audience with a challenge ("you have seen this incident based on sworn testimony. Can you prove it didn't happen"?), a warning ("Many scientists believe that another world is watching us this moment"), and concluding wish ("God help us...in the future".)

Government conspiracy
Through Jeff's initial conversation with his wife, the film introduces the notion of a government and military conspiracy to cover up information on documented UFO sightings. This notion was clearly influenced by the emergence and increased popularity of a UFO conspiracy theory. But the implications for the public's distrust of the government were atypical for a 1950s American film. Anti-statist ideas became more popular in the 1960s, when the subject became "safe" for mainstream cinema to explore. In this area and perhaps others, the film was ahead of its time.

Message from the aliens
The film contains a cautionary message from the aliens. The earliest use of this concept in film was probably in The Day the Earth Stood Still (1951), and it had since seen frequent use in science fiction films. The idea was that humanity's self-destructive behavior was the real threat, not any external source of danger.

Miscellaneous production details and special effects
The film's "iconic" flying saucers have been variously identified as paper plates or hubcaps. But according to the documentary Flying Saucers Over Hollywood, The Plan 9 Companion (1991), they were actually a recognizable plastic model kit, first issued in 1952 by toy manufacturer Paul Lindberg's Lindberg Line model kit company: this was the first science fiction plastic model kit produced (product #517). Roughly matching the era's popular image of UFOs, the saucer model was disk-shaped with a clear dome on top. Under the kit dome was a little green alien pilot. This pilot figure was not used in the film. Its multiple flying saucers were painted metallic silver, including the domes. Two slightly modified versions of the Lindberg kit are used in Plan 9s UFO scenes.

Footage of Los Angeles is used to ground the otherworldly events in a realistic setting. As a resident, Wood was likely familiar with the shooting locations. The scene where the military fires at the flying saucers is actual military stock footage.

Lynn Lemon, who plays an unnamed minister, was one of the Baptists variously involved in the production of the film. J. Edward Reynolds was a leader of the Southern Baptist Convention in Beverly Hills, California, and Hugh Thomas was one of his associates from the church; both play gravediggers, and Reynolds was also the film's executive producer. At the time of the film's creation, David De Mering was the personal secretary and alleged lover of fellow cast member Bunny Breckinridge; his inclusion in the cast was probably a result of this association.

Harry Thomas, the film's makeup man, was incensed when Wood refused to follow his suggestions for the aliens' appearance. Thomas had created some rubber chin appliances to elongate their faces, as well as "cat's eyes" contact lenses and green wigs to lend them a more unearthly appearance. But Wood told him they did not have enough time for Thomas's suggestions, which led Thomas to withdraw his name from the film's credits. "I was really mad at Wood", he said years later in interviews.

According to Maila Nurmi (Vampira), Paul Marco paid her $200 to act as a vampire in the film. She recalled insisting that her part be silent, as she did not like the dialogue Wood had written for her. This recollection might be inaccurate since the zombie undead of the film are generally mute. She gave the film a "regal presence" and theatrical mannerisms. Her performance is reminiscent of a silent film actress; she credited Theda Bara as her main influence.

The male alien Eros is apparently named after Eros, the Greek god of love. Craig suggests that the female alien's name, Tanna, invokes the name of another Greek deity: Thanatos, god of death.

The Pentagon office depicted includes a U.S. map with the sign of the Atchison, Topeka & Santa Fe Railroad. The same map appears in Baghdad After Midnight (1954), also filmed at Quality Studios; it was probably a Quality Studios background prop.

Bela Lugosi's last film

Shortly before Lugosi's death in August 1956, he had been working with Wood on a handful of half-realized projects, variously titled The Vampire's Tomb or The Ghoul Goes West. Some scenes connected to these projects had been shot. They featured Lugosi weeping at a funeral, picking a rose from a bush in front of Tor Johnson's house in the daytime, walking in and out of the Johnson home's side door at nighttime, and a daylight scene, on a patch of highway, with Lugosi stalking toward the camera and dramatically spreading his Dracula cape before furling it around himself, then walking back the way he came. According to the documentary Flying Saucers: The "Plan 9" Companion, these shots were all improvised. Only the first two had reached any level of completion. When Lugosi died, Wood shelved the projects.

Shortly after Lugosi's death, the story and screenplay for Grave Robbers from Outer Space were written and finalized, with Wood planning to use the unconnected, unrelated Lugosi footage as a means of getting a known credit into the film. Wood also used the Lugosi footage as a means of attracting other actors to the picture, gaining the interest of Gregory Walcott and Maila Nurmi, among others, by telling them he was making "Bela Lugosi's last movie". Though Wood's actions were driven in part by the desire to give his film a "star name" and attract horror fans, he meant the Lugosi cameo as a loving farewell and tribute to the actor, who had become a close friend. Wood hired his wife's chiropractor, Tom Mason, as a stand-in for Lugosi, although Mason was taller than Lugosi and bore no resemblance to him, making Mason one of the earliest known "fake Shemps".

Wood first planned to make Lugosi the grandfather of Paula Trent, the film's lead female character, with Vampira being the revived corpse of Paula's grandmother, which explains why Lugosi returns to Paula's house after death, enters her bedroom, follows her into the cemetery, and winds up skeletonized on her patio. At the beginning of the film, Lugosi picks a rose from a bush in the front yard of the house where the Trents live (Tor Johnson's house in real life), their patio being in the backyard, and the cemetery being next door. But Wood later decided to reduce Lugosi's character's importance, making him unconnected to Paula Trent. Narration by Criswell was employed in an attempt to somehow link the Lugosi footage to the rest of Plan 9, but the Dracula cape he wears was hard to explain. The theatrical cut of the film utilized every last scrap of material Wood had of Lugosi, including minor sprocket discolorations, and film trims that in a normal film would be discarded as unusable. Cuts of Plan 9 on VHS during the 1980s and '90s, most of which were unauthorized bootleg dupes, varied drastically in both quality and the amount of Lugosi footage retained.

Coincidentally, further Lugosi footage that Wood had shot sometime earlier was to have been the basis of a second, posthumous, feature film, Ghouls of the Moon. But this footage was shot on old, volatile nitrate film stock, and had dissolved into a toxic-smelling sludge by the time Wood returned to use it in 1959. Therefore, Ghouls of the Moon was completely abandoned. Mystery surrounds the content and nature of the lost material, described only as "wild" by a friend of Wood's, who had watched it shortly after it was shot.

Reception

Release
Grave Robbers from Outer Space was shot in November 1956 and premiered on March 15, 1957, at the Carlton Theatre in Los Angeles (the title at the time was Grave Robbers from Outer Space). Another year elapsed before Distributors Corporation of America (DCA) picked up the film. But that company folded, and it was not released again until July 22, 1959, through DCA's receiver, Valiant Pictures. By then, the film had been retitled Plan 9 from Outer Space. The original title is mentioned at the end of Criswell's opening narration, when he asks the audience: "Can your heart stand the shocking facts about ... grave robbers from outer space?" It is thought that Wood might have changed the title himself because he did not want his backers to know that the film was being distributed in the South. (By 1959, the backers had given up all hope of seeing a return on their investment.) But the new title was less indicative of the film's content and may have contributed to its distribution problems. Like many independent films of the period, Plan 9 was distributed under a states' rights basis.

Plan 9 was sometimes screened as part of a double feature. In Chicago, it was first seen alongside the British thriller Time Lock (1957), a film mostly remembered as an early credit for Sean Connery. It was later used as a "co-feature" (B movie) for double-feature screenings of The Trap (1959), a film noir starring Richard Widmark. In Texas, it was seen alongside Devil Girl From Mars (1954), a reissued British science fiction film. Not long after, the picture was sold to television and was shown on Chiller Theatre and similar venues for years.

Plan 9 from Outer Space gained notoriety through the Medveds' book because of its multiple continuity problems.

During the first aircraft cockpit scene, the first officer is reading from a script in his lap, and a flash of light from a flying saucer reveals the boom microphone's shadow. The microphone and flight officer's script are not visible in the original theatrical release, as they do not fit the frame for its original 1.85:1 projected aspect ratio. These mistakes are noticeable only in the film's open matte video transfers.

Lead actor Gregory Walcott, who admired Ed Wood's tenacity in his projects, still had some bad opinions of Plan 9. He said years later, "Ed had poor taste and was undisciplined. If he had ten million dollars, [Plan 9] would still have been a piece of tasteless shit. I liked Ed Wood but I could discern no genius there. His main concern was making his next film.... It looked like they shot the thing in a kitchen....worst film of all time. Thirty years later, it's come back to haunt me."

Vampira years later recalled: "I didn't have a decent costume for Plan 9. What I wore was old, worn out. It looks like I had a hole in the crotch of the dress, if you notice....But I thought, 'oh well, nobody's ever gonna see this movie, so it doesn't matter'."

Music
The music for Plan 9 from Outer Space was compiled by Gordon Zahler. Zahler used stock recordings of works by about a dozen composers, a fairly common procedure in the 1950s for low-budget films and television programs. But he apparently never provided a reliable accounting for the score. In 1996, Paul Mandell produced a CD that recreated the film's score by tracking down the stock recordings and the composers, and wrote an article about it for Film Score Monthly. Some websites give proper credit to these composers.

Revisions
In 2006, Legend Films released a colorized version of Plan 9 from Outer Space on DVD. Though the colorization process was largely done straight, unlike the campy bright colors used in the studio's release of Reefer Madness, there were a few alterations. Legend had auctioned off the opportunity to insert new material into the film through two auctions on eBay. The first allowed the auction winner to provide a photograph that is digitally inserted into part of the scene between the Ghoul Man and Paula Trent. The second allowed the winner to have his or her name placed on a gravestone during a scene with Wood regular Tor Johnson. The third alteration is at a point where Eros gets punched and his skin briefly turns green.

Autographed pre-release copies of the DVD were made available in 2005, and the colorized version was also given special theatrical screenings at various U.S. theaters, including the Castro Theatre. The DVD featured an audio commentary track by comedian Michael J. Nelson of Mystery Science Theater 3000 fame, in which he heckles the film in a style similar to an episode of the series, a restored black-and-white version of Plan 9, a home video of Wood in drag performing a striptease (Wood was a transvestite), a subtitled information track and a comedic feature narrated by Nelson detailing the "lost" Plans 1–8. The autographed edition also came with a limited-edition air freshener. Nelson's commentary is also available through his company RiffTrax, where it can be downloaded as either an MP3 audio file or a DivX video file with the commentary embedded into the colorized version of the film.

In 2011, PassmoreLab, a San Diego-based 3D production/conversion studio, produced a 3D version of Legend's colorized version, which received limited theatrical release.

Documentaries
In 1992, Plan 9 from Outer Space was the subject of the documentary Flying Saucers Over Hollywood: The Plan 9 Companion, which is included on Image Entertainment's DVD edition of Plan 9. The documentary visits several locations related to the film, including the building with Wood's former office (at 4477 Hollywood Boulevard), and what was left of the small sound stage used for the film's interiors, which is down a small alley next to the Harvey Apartments at 5640 Santa Monica Boulevard. That same year, Rudolph Grey's book Nightmare of Ecstasy: The Life and Art of Edward D. Wood, Jr., was published and contained anecdotes about the making of this film. Grey notes that participants in the original events sometimes contradict one another, but he relates each person's recollections for posterity.

In 2006, the documentary Vampira: The Movie, by Kevin Sean Michaels, chronicled Nurmi's work with Wood and her role as television's first horror host.

Home media

To date there have been only a handful of good-quality or restored DVDs and Blu-rays. A good-quality 35mm print from the Wade Williams Collection was released on DVD in the U.S. (Image Entertainment, 2000), the U.K. (MPIC Video, 2009), Germany (Winkler Film/Alive AG, 2009), and Australia (Force Video, 2001). All feature Flying Saucers Over Hollywood and the original theatrical trailer. Legend Films' restored colorized and original black-and-white versions have been released on DVD and Blu-ray in the U.S., and on DVD in various other territories.

No home video release has featured the film's original theatrical aspect ratio. Plan 9 was composed and shot for the 1.85:1 widescreen ratio, which by 1957 had become the common theatrical format alongside CinemaScope. Wood never intended for his film to be seen in a 1.33:1 open matte aspect ratio. This has led to various boom mics and edges of sets/props being seen at the top and bottom of the image. Further complicating the matter, Wood incorporated stock footage framed in 1.33:1 (including his own footage of Lugosi), which becomes overly cropped when shown in widescreen.

Turner Classic Movies has since presented a high-definition transfer of the film in the original 1.85:1 ratio. The stock footage shots in this version have been slightly adjusted to better fit the frame.

Remakes
Filmmaker Ernie Fosselius (of Hardware Wars fame) created the 2009 short film Plan 9.1 from Outer Space, which features hand-carved wooden puppets of the characters from the film. The puppets act out the scenes along with the original film's edited soundtrack.

As of September 2009, there was an additional proposed remake: Grave Robbers from Outer Space was written and directed by Christopher Kahler for Drunkenflesh Films.

Another remake was released by Darkstone Entertainment, written and directed by John Johnson. The teaser trailer was released on the film's website on September 9, 2009. Horror host Mr. Lobo, Brian Krause, and internet celebrities Matt Sloan, Aaron Yonda, James Rolfe, and Monique Dupree performed in the film, which was released through video-on-demand on February 16, 2016. It released on physical media for retail outlets on January 5, 2017.

Legacy

Some critics, including Michael Medved, consider Plan 9 from Outer Space the worst film in the history of cinema. But others have rated the film more positively; many of them say the film is simply too amusing to be considered the worst film ever made, and that its ineptitude adds to its charm.

On review aggregator Rotten Tomatoes, the film holds an approval rating of 66% based on 38 reviews, with an average score of 5.70/10. The website's critical consensus reads, "The epitome of so-bad-it's-good cinema, Plan 9 from Outer Space is an unintentionally hilarious sci-fi 'thriller' from anti-genius Ed Wood that is justly celebrated for its staggering ineptitude." On Metacritic, the film received a score of 56 based on 13 reviews, indicating "mixed or average reviews".

Josiah Teal of Film Threat gave the film a 10/10, calling it a "quintessential cult classic" and writing that it is a "testament to a love of cinema and making all the wrong creative choices." There are also claims that Wood managed to convey some interesting ideas. The Encyclopedia of Science Fiction, for instance, claims that "the film's reception modulated away from jovial mockery of its wanton indifference to normal professional standards of script, performance, and effects, in favour of a more nuanced appreciation of its dreamlike narrative assemblage of genre tropes, resonantly unspeakable dialogue, and irrepressible budgetary ingenuity."

As of 2021, Plan 9 had failed to place in the IMDb Bottom 100, a list compiled using average scores given by Internet Movie Database users, though some of Wood's other movies had. In 1996, the film was saluted by the author of the Cult Flicks and Trash Pics edition of VideoHound, which says: "The film has become so famous for its own badness that it's now beyond criticism".

In 1978 musician Glenn Danzig founded the record label Plan 9 Records, an apparent reference to the film. The label ceased operations in 1995.

The film's title was the inspiration for the name of Bell Labs' successor to the Unix operating system. Plan 9 from Bell Labs was developed over several years starting in the mid-1980s and released to the general public in 1995.

In 1996, Paul Mandell produced a CD that recreated the film's musical score; the CD was released by the now-defunct Retrosonic Corp.

In October 2005, a stage adaptation, Plan Nine from Outer Space: The Rip-Off, was staged in Jacksonville, Florida. The play, based on Wood's script, is by Steven Bailey. In 2006, another stage adaptation, Plan LIVE from Outer Space!, was staged at the Toronto Fringe Festival. That play, also based on Wood's script, is by James Gordon Taylor; it won a Canadian Comedy Award the next year. A stage adaptation was also performed in Glasgow by Off World Productions in 2015, again based on Wood's script. The Off World production was also performed at the 2017 Edinburgh Fringe Festival.

The Seinfeld episode "The Chinese Restaurant" involves trying to get a table at a Chinese restaurant before going to see Plan 9 from Outer Space, which is playing for one night only. Jerry emphasizes the significance of Plan 9, saying, "Just a movie? You don't understand. This isn't plans 1 through 8 from outer space. This is Plan 9! This is the one that worked, the worst movie ever made!"

One level from the 2005 video game Destroy All Humans! features the alien protagonist causing mayhem at a drive-in theater that is playing on loop the scene when the flying saucers are being attacked by the U.S. military. The scene can also be unlocked for viewing by the player.

A portion of the film was featured in The X-Files episode "Hollywood A.D.", broadcast in April 2000. The series' protagonist, Fox Mulder, is paid a visit by his partner Dana Scully at his home. The film is playing on the television, and the VHS sleeve is seen as Mulder says he has seen Plan 9 42 times.

In 1991, Eternity Comics released a three-issue miniseries, Plan 9 from Outer Space: Thirty Years Later!, which served as an unofficial sequel to the film.

An adventure game of the same name was made, in which the player must recover the film from Lugosi's double, who has stolen it.

The film was included in live performances at the SF Sketchfest by The Film Crew, composed of former Mystery Science Theater 3000 cast members Michael J. Nelson, Kevin Murphy, and Bill Corbett. A commentary based on the performances was released by RiffTrax. It was advertised as a "Three Riffer Edition", due to Nelson's solo commentary for the film's colorized DVD release, which had previously been sold as an audio file on the Rifftrax website. On August 20, 2009, the RiffTrax trio performed the commentary at a live event in Nashville, Tennessee, and the performance was broadcast to theaters across the country.

The 1994 film Ed Wood is an Oscar-winning American comedy-drama biopic produced and directed by Tim Burton and starring Johnny Depp. It depicts Wood's creation of Plan 9 from Outer Space. The film was released to critical acclaim but was a box office bomb, making only $5.9 million on a $18 million budget. It won two Academy Awards: Best Supporting Actor for Martin Landau and Best Makeup for Rick Baker, who designed Landau's prosthetic makeup, and the makeup for Ve Neill and Yolanda Toussieng.

In connection with the Planet Nine hypothesis, the film title recently found its way into academic discourse. In 2016, an article titled Planet Nine from Outer Space about the hypothesized planet in the outer region of the Solar System was published in Scientific American. Several conference talks since then have used the same word play, as did a 2019 lecture by Mike Brown.

American metalcore band Crown the Empire included a sample of Criswell's opening monologue in its single "Hologram", from its 2016 album Retrograde.

A clip from the film is featured in the movie theater sequence in the 1996 full-motion video game Goosebumps: Escape from Horrorland.

See also
 Ed Wood filmography
 List of American films of 1959
 List of films featuring extraterrestrials
 List of movies considered the worst

References

Citations

General and cited references 

 Craig, Rob. Ed Wood, Mad Genius: A Critical Study of the Films. Jefferson, North Carolina: McFarland & Company, 2009. .
 Grey, Rudolph. Nightmare of Ecstasy: The Life and Art of Edward D. Wood, Jr. Portland, Oregon: Feral House, 1992. .
 Peary, Danny. Cult Movies. New York: Delacorte Press, 1981. .
 Schwartz, Carol. Videohound's Complete Guide to Cult Flicks and Trash Pics. Canton, Michigan: Visible Ink Press, 1995. .
 Sloan, Will. "Can Your Heart Stand the Shocking Facts About Kelton the Cop A/K/A Paul Marco?" Filmfax, April 2005, pp. 88–89.
 Thompson, Brett, director. The Haunted World of Edward D. Wood, Jr. Documentary film, 1996.
 Warren, Bill. Keep Watching the Skies: American Science Fiction Films of the Fifties, 21st Century Edition. Jefferson, North Carolina: McFarland & Company, 2009. .

External links

 
 
 
 
 
 
 

1959 films
1959 horror films
1959 independent films
1950s science fiction horror films
American independent films
American science fiction horror films
1950s English-language films
Films directed by Ed Wood
Films produced by Ed Wood
Alien invasions in films
American black-and-white films
Films about extraterrestrial life
Films set in Washington, D.C.
Films set in Los Angeles
Films set in the San Fernando Valley
Films shot in Los Angeles
American zombie films
Articles containing video clips
Films with screenplays by Ed Wood
1950s rediscovered films
Collage film
Rediscovered American films
American exploitation films
1950s American films